The Lapeer Loggers were a professional ice hockey team based in Lapeer, Michigan. The Loggers played the 2010–11 season as a member of the All American Hockey League and played their home games at Polar Palace Arena in Lapeer, MI.

Team history
The Loggers were approved for membership in the AAHL in August 2010.
On January 3, the AAHL took over the operations of the Lapeer Loggers and very soon thereafter, due to league wide difficulties, both the Queen City Storm and the Troy Bruins folded. The AAHL assimilated players from Lapeer, Queen City, and Troy, into the newly christened Michigan Moose. After just a few games, the AAHL called an early end to the regular season and played the AAHL's final playoffs (won by the Battle Creek Revolution) before disbanding the league.

Affiliates
On September 14, 2010, the Lapeer Loggers announced that they had signed an affiliation agreement with the South Muskoka Shield of the Greater Metro Junior A Hockey League.

References

External links
Official Lapeer Loggers website

Ice hockey teams in Michigan
Lapeer County, Michigan
Sports in Metro Detroit